3i Infotech Ltd (established as ICICI Infotech Ltd) is an Indian IT company, incorporated in 1993. 3i Infotech was a wholly owned subsidiary of ICICI/ICICI Bank until ICICI divested the majority of the shares in March 2002, at which point the company ceased to be a subsidiary of ICICI.

Products and services
The company provides software IT services and business process outsourcing for a variety of industries including insurance, banking, capital markets, mutual funds and asset management, wealth management, government, manufacturing and retail.

Worldwide presence

See also

Software industry in Telangana
List of public listed software companies of India
Firstsource
Hinjawadi

References

External links
 Official Website

1993 establishments in Maharashtra
Companies based in Mumbai
Software companies based in Mumbai
International information technology consulting firms
Software companies established in 1993
Information technology companies of India
Indian brands
Indian companies established in 1993
Companies listed on the National Stock Exchange of India
Companies listed on the Bombay Stock Exchange